The 1982–83 season was the 86th season of competitive football in Scotland.

Overview

In a tightly fought contest Dundee United won their maiden Scottish league title. The league remained undecided until the last day of the season with Aberdeen, Celtic and Dundee United in contention. On the final day Celtic beat Rangers 4–2 and Aberdeen beat Hibernian 5–0, Dundee United held their nerve to win a historic first championship after beating local rivals Dundee 2–1 at Dens Park.

Scottish League Premier Division

Champions: Dundee United
Relegated: Morton, Kilmarnock

Scottish League Division One

Promoted: St. Johnstone, Hearts
Relegated: Dunfermline Athletic, Queen's Park

Scottish League Division Two

Promoted: Brechin City, Meadowbank Thistle

Other honours

Cup honours

Individual honours

Scottish national team

Key:
(H) = Home match
(A) = Away match
ECQG1 = European Championship qualifying – Group 1
BHC = British Home Championship

See also
1982–83 Aberdeen F.C. season

Notes and references

 
Seasons in Scottish football